Mohan Singh (1905–1978) was a noted Indian poet in the Punjabi language and an academic, and one of the early pioneers of modern Punjabi poetry.

Biography
Born in 1905 at Lyallpur (now in Pakistan), Mohan Singh spent the early years of his life at his ancestral village Dhamial in Rawalpindi District. His poem Kuri Pathohar Di is reminiscent of his romantic early days. He obtained a master's degree in Persian and started his career as a Lecturer in Persian, Urdu and Punjabi at Khalsa College, Amritsar in 1933. He was well read in English, Persian and Urdu literatures. At Amritsar, Teja Singh, Sant Singh Sekhon, Gurbachan Singh 'Talib' became his friends.
In 1940, he joined as a lecturer in the Sikh National College, Lahore, but after some time he left the job and started a firm, Hind Publishers to promote the literary standards of Punjabi publications. In 1939, he started his famous literary Punjabi monthly, Panj darya. After Partition In 1947 he shifted his business to Amritsar and then to Jullundur, but ultimately he closed down the firm. Then he became the teacher in Khalsa College, Patiala.
Later, he worked as Professor Emeritus at the Punjab Agricultural University, Ludhiana from 1970 to 1974 and made this industrial town of Punjab his home towards the end of his life.

Collection
Prof Mohan Singh gave Punjabi poetry collections like Sanve Pattar (The Green Leaves), Buhe (Doors) and Jindran (Locks), a total of 10 poetry books and one Mahakavya.

Prof. Mohan Singh Mela
Prof Mohan Singh Memorial International Cultural Mela was organized every year by Prof Mohan Singh Memorial Foundation.

Village Nanoki Nabha
Prof. Mohan Singh Mela is going to organize at Village Nanoki in Nabha Tehsil. It is one of the best Little Modern Solo Village. The credit of bringing this village to the international map goes to Sardar Abninder Singh Grewal an artist and industrialist. This village is bought up by Late Sardar Metab Singh Grewal Minister in Sardar Hira Singh King of Nabha Kingdom.

Awards
He received Sahitya Akademi award in 1959 Wadda Vela (Poetry).

Modern Punjabi poetry
Prof. Mohan Singh was known as the father of modern Punjabi poetry. The other poets who contributed significantly to the growth of modern Punjabi poetry in the initial years include Amrita Pritam, Harbhajan Singh and Shiv Kumar Batalvi. Mohan Singh has been hailed as the greatest Punjabi poet of the 20th century He is hailed by many modern artists including Hadiqa Kiani who refers to him, and recites his lyrics in her live versions of "Buhe Bariyan". https://open.spotify.com/track/7C6STbO1MhvBUt2xdSbrnl?si=U0iXTA-SSnqPMkIvUxUboA

See also
List of Punjabi language poets

References

External links
Prof Mohan Singh's Poetry in Roman Script

Punjabi-language poets
People from Mardan District
Punjabi people
Recipients of the Sahitya Akademi Award in Punjabi
1905 births
1978 deaths
Academic staff of Khalsa College, Amritsar
20th-century Indian poets